Balen-Keiheuvel Aerodrome  is a private general aviation airfield located in Keiheuvel-Balen, a municipality of Belgium. Aircraft on the airport include both motorized aircraft and gliders.

See also 
 Transportation in Belgium

References

External links 
 Aeroclub Keiheuvel-Balen

Airports established in 1956
Airports in Antwerp Province
Balen